Carolina or Hopedale is an unincorporated community located on the Haw River in Alamance County, North Carolina, United States. It is located 4/5 mile east-southeast of Glencoe. It lies at an elevation of 591 feet (180 m).

In late 2018, Copland Fabrics closed its textile mills in the community, laying off 200 workers.

References

Unincorporated communities in North Carolina
Unincorporated communities in Alamance County, North Carolina